Nikisch is a surname of Slavic origin (Nikiš, "little Nik(olaus)") and can refer to:

 Artúr Nikisch (1855–1922), a Hungarian conductor ∞ (1885) Amélie Nikisch, née Heussner (1862, Brussel – 1938, Berlin), actress, composer
 Arthur Philipp Nikisch (1888–1968), German lawyer, son of Arthur (de)
 Mitja Nikisch (1899, Leipzig – 1936), German classical pianist, dance band leader, composer, son of Arthur
 Roy (Abelardo) Nikisch (born 1951), a Croatian-Argentine Radical Civic Union senator
 Jan Jacek Nikisch (1910-1996) – Polen advocate

Nickisch 
 Curt Nickisch

Niekisch 
 Ernst Niekisch (1889, Trebnitz, Silesia – 1967), a prominent German exponent of National Bolshevism
 Manfred Niekisch (born 1951, Nuremberg), a German biologist
 Wieland Niekisch (born 1957), German politician

See also 
 Niki (disambiguation)
 Nikić
 Nikšić
 Nikisha (< Nikita)
 Nikishov
 Nikishin (e.g. Bogdan Nikishin) (ru)
 Nikiszowiec

Slavic-language surnames
Croatian surnames